The 2013–14 Stony Brook Seawolves men's basketball team represented Stony Brook University in the 2013–14 NCAA Division I men's basketball season. They were coached by ninth year head coach Steve Pikiell and played their home games at Pritchard Gymnasium. They were members of the America East Conference. They finished the season 23–11, 13–3 in American East play to finish in second place. They advanced to the championship game of the American East Conference tournament where they lost to Albany. They were invited to the College Basketball Invitational where they lost in the first round to Siena.

Roster

Schedule

|-
!colspan=9 style="background:#; color:white;"| Non-conference regular season

|-
!colspan=9 style="background:#; color:white;"| America East regular season

|-
!colspan=9 style="background:#; color:white;"| America East tournament

|-
!colspan=9 style="background:#; color:white;"| CBI

References

Stony Brook Seawolves men's basketball seasons
Stony Brook
Stony Brook
Stony Brook
Stony Brook